The Year When Stardust Fell is a science fiction novel written by Raymond F. Jones.  It was initially published in 1958 by the John C. Winston Company.

This is one of the thirty-five juvenile novels that comprise the Winston Science Fiction set, which novels were published in the 1950s for a readership of teen-aged boys.  The typical protagonist in these books was a boy in his late teens who was proficient in the art of electronics, a hobby that was easily available to the readers.  In this story, as in Son of the Stars, the protagonist has a ham radio and a small observatory with a telescope he built himself.

Synopsis
The menace in this story consists of dust from the tail of a comet.  It consists of a colloid, analogous to smoke, that incorporates an unknown transuranic element.  That element has a great affinity for metal surfaces and it weakens their surface tension, thereby enabling rapidly moving parts to cold weld themselves into solid rigidity.

Plot
In the town of Mayfield high-school senior Ken Maddox is among the people fascinated by a giant comet whose path is just grazing Earth's orbit.  For the next four months Earth will float within the comet's tail and on the first night of that sojourn Ken's car and others begin to have problems with overheating.  The next day almost all of the cars in Mayfield and other cities across the country have overheated and then refused to start.  Soon all machinery is seizing up, its moving parts cold welded to each other.  Because the effect is happening all over the world, people begin blaming the comet.

As the disaster becomes progressively more serious, Ken and his friends in the high school's science club prepare to study samples of the fused metal at the local college, where Ken's father teaches chemistry, and to try to get a sample of what the comet is putting into Earth's atmosphere.  While they work, Mayfield is cut off from the outside world and the mayor and the sheriff impose rationing against the anticipated shortages.

After a short stint in a wood-cutting crew bringing in fuel for the coming winter, Ken is called to assist in the work at the college.  Along with his friends and the other scientists, he helps with experiments aimed at identifying the cause of the cold-welding phenomenon.  A spectroscopic look through a telescope, compared to spectrograms of the affected metals confirms that the comet is the source of the trouble.  At the same time Ken and his friends make contact with several ham radio operators around the country, intending to share information.

Little by little, as civilization crumbles around them, the Mayfield science team learns about the comet dust and how to protect machinery from it.  One by one, the radio contacts cease as violence sweeps over the metropolitan areas, but aided by a clue from Berkeley just before it was destroyed Ken's father devises a compound that will decontaminate metal surfaces.  A failed attack by marauders attempting to rob the town and a flu epidemic decimate the population, but Ken has an idea that using ultrasound will coagulate the comet dust so that it will fall out of the atmosphere.  Egged on by a pair of fanatics, a mob burns the college, but not before the knowledge of the ultrasonic coagulators has been shared.  With people in more and more areas building coagulators and decontaminating metal parts, people around the world begin the slow and painful process of rebuilding civilization.

Publication history
 1958, USA, John C. Winston Company (Winston Science Fiction #31), Pub date 1958 Mar 17, Hardback (203 pp)
1960, Germany, Pabel Verlag (Utopia Grossband #124), Pub date 1960, Paperback digest (94 pp), as Sternenstaub (Star Dust)

Reviews
The book was reviewed by
P. Schuyler Miller at Astounding Science Fiction (Feb 1959)
Floyd C. Gale at Galaxy Magazine (Jun 1959)
Kirkus Reviews had this to say:
“Mayfield, a small town, was immobilized by panic when Earth moved into the atmosphere of the tail of a comet. Mob rule threatened as all transportation ceased because of adverse reactions on metals. Granny Wicks, a half demented old sooth-sayer, prophesied doom for the town, frightening the superstitious. As transportation ceased nation-wide, food shortages developed. The greedy acted characteristically. Refugees poured into Mayfield. The mayor reinforced military rule, erected barriers against the hungry. The minister succored the homeless while mob rule prevailed in neighboring communities. Only a few--among them Dr. Maddox, chemistry professor at the state agricultural college, and his son Ken, a student--kept their heads to seek constructive counter-measures and an ultimate answer to the baffling cause of the new phenomena. This is well-done science fiction illustrating community action in crisis. Timely and with an appropriate overtone of terror.”

References
Notes

Sources
Barron, Neil (2004).  Anatomy of Wonder: A Critical Guide to Science Fiction, 5th Edition.  Westport, CT: Libraries Unlimited.  Pg 255.  .
Tuck, Donald H. (1974). The Encyclopedia of Science Fiction and Fantasy. Chicago: Advent. pg. 248. .

Listings
The book is listed at
The Library of Congress as http://lccn.loc.gov/58005676
The British Library as UIN = BLL001898143

External links
Go to Project Gutenberg to read the story online.
Go to Read Central to read the story online.
 

1958 American novels
1958 science fiction novels
American science fiction novels
American young adult novels
Children's science fiction novels
Apocalyptic novels
Fiction about comets